DiPaolo is a surname of Italian origin. Notable people with the surname include:

Anthony DiPaolo (born 1958), American businessman
Frank DiPaolo (1906–2013), American politician
Ilio DiPaolo (1926–1995), Italian professional wrestler
Joey DiPaolo (born 1979), American AIDS activist
Nick DiPaolo (born 1962), American stand-up comedian, actor and writer
Dante DiPaolo (1926–2013), American dancer

See also
Di Paolo

Italian-language surnames